Aleksandar Stankov (born 19 February 1991) is a Macedonian footballer who plays as a forward for Dutch Derde Divisie side RKSV Groene Ster.

Club career
He had a spell in Faroese football with HB Tórshavn. He then played or German Oberliga side Union Nettetal.

On 12 January 2020 RKSV Groene Ster confirmed, that the club had signed Stankov.

International career
He was a member of the Macedonian U-21 national team.

Career statistics

Club

Personal life
Aleksandar Stankov's twin brother Antonio Stankov also plays professional football.

References

 Horsens lejer igen Stankov‚ bold.dk, 29 January 2016
 Viborg sender Stankov til Færøerne‚ 11 March 2017

External links
 Voetball International profile
 Official Danish Superliga stats 
 Macedonian Football 
 
 

1991 births
Living people
Sportspeople from Štip
Twin sportspeople
Macedonian twins
Association football forwards
Macedonian footballers
North Macedonia youth international footballers
North Macedonia under-21 international footballers
Roda JC Kerkrade players
TOP Oss players
Hobro IK players
Viborg FF players
AC Horsens players
Havnar Bóltfelag players
RKSV Groene Ster players
Eredivisie players
Eerste Divisie players
Danish Superliga players
Danish 1st Division players
Faroe Islands Premier League players
Oberliga (football) players
Derde Divisie players
Macedonian expatriate footballers
Expatriate footballers in the Netherlands
Macedonian expatriate sportspeople in the Netherlands
Expatriate men's footballers in Denmark
Macedonian expatriate sportspeople in Denmark
Expatriate footballers in Germany
Macedonian expatriate sportspeople in Germany
Expatriate footballers in the Faroe Islands